2C-Se is a lesser-known psychedelic drug. It was originally named by Alexander Shulgin as described in his book PiHKAL (Phenethylamines i Have Known And Loved). Shulgin considered 2C-Se to be around three times the potency of mescaline, but was too concerned about toxicity to test it extensively, though he considered it noteworthy as the only psychedelic drug to contain a selenium atom.

See also 
 Phenethylamine
 Psychedelics, dissociatives and deliriants

References

External links 
 2C-Se Entry in PiHKAL

2C (psychedelics)
Organoselenium compounds
Selenium(−II) compounds
Selenoethers